Cache poisoning refers to a computer security vulnerability where invalid entries can be placed into a cache, which are then assumed to be valid when later used.  Two common varieties are DNS cache poisoning and ARP cache poisoning.  involves the poisoning of web caches. Attacks on other, more specific, caches also exist.

References 

Computer security exploits
Cache (computing)